12 Paces Without a Head is a 2009 film set in the North Sea in 1401.  The film centers on the German folk hero Klaus Störtebeker, who was a pirate at the time.  The title comes from a legend which asserts that when he was captured by the Hanseatic League, he struck a deal with his captors that every one of his men whom he could walk past after being decapitated, would be let go. Störtebeker's body allegedly managed to make twelve paces before collapsing.

Cast

See also
 List of historical drama films

External links
 

2009 films
2000s adventure comedy films
2000s buddy comedy films
Comedy films based on actual events
Films set in Germany
Films set in the Holy Roman Empire
Films set in the 1400s
2000s German-language films
German adventure comedy films
Pirate films
German historical adventure films
2000s historical comedy films
German historical comedy films
2000s German films